James Horace Parks (12 May 1903 – 21 November 1980) was a cricketer who played for Sussex County Cricket Club and England.

Parks was a right-handed opening batsman and a medium-pace bowler of inswingers. He was a regular member of the Sussex county team from 1927 and scored 1,000 runs in every season except one up to 1939, when his first-class career ended with the Second World War. In 1935, he did the all-rounder's "double" of 1,000 runs and 100 wickets, but nothing in Parks' career suggested he was an out-of-the-ordinary county cricketer — until 1937.

In that year, by scoring 3,003 runs and taking 101 wickets in the season, he set a record that is all but certainly never to be equalled.  Only 13 cricketers have scored more than 2,000 runs and taken 100 wickets in an English season; no other cricketer has ever taken 100 wickets while scoring 3,000 runs. His run total included 11 centuries and he also took 21 catches. Having earlier in his career been termed "solid", Parks revealed in 1937 a full range of previously unsuspected strokes and was praised by Wisden for his "enterprise".

Parks was called up for the 1937 Test match against New Zealand at Lord's alongside another debutant, Leonard Hutton. He scored 22 and 7 and took three wickets, but was never chosen again. Unsurprisingly, he was a Wisden Cricketer of the Year in 1938.

After the Second World War II, Parks played Lancashire League cricket and he was coach at Sussex for a period in the 1960s.

See also 
 Double (cricket)

References

External links 
 

English cricketers
England Test cricketers
Sussex cricketers
Canterbury cricketers
Commonwealth XI cricketers
Wisden Cricketers of the Year
Players cricketers
English cricket umpires
English cricket coaches
People from Haywards Heath
1903 births
1980 deaths
Marylebone Cricket Club cricketers
English cricketers of 1919 to 1945
L. H. Tennyson's XI cricket team